Manuel Padilla (born February 5, 1996) is an American soccer player who most recently played for New Mexico United in the USL Championship.

Career

Youth and college
Padilla played four years of college soccer at the University of San Francisco between 2014 and 2017. While attending USF, Padilla was involved in a sexual misconduct case involving a fellow student.

Padilla also played for Premier Development League side FC Golden State Force in 2016, and San Francisco City FC in 2017.

Professional
On January 21, 2018, Padilla was selected 89th overall in the 2018 MLS SuperDraft by Houston Dynamo. On March 16, 2018, Padilla signed with Houston's United Soccer League affiliate side Rio Grande Valley FC. He has also made his 1st team debut with Houston Dynamo in the US Open Cup.

Padilla joined USL Championship side New Mexico United on March 7, 2019, ahead of their inaugural season.

On July 14, 2020, New Mexico United suspended Padilla pending an internal investigation into his sexual misconduct case. Following this investigation, Padilla was released by the club on July 25, 2020.

References

External links
 
 
 Manny Padilla at San Francisco Dons

1996 births
Living people
American soccer players
Association football defenders
FC Golden State Force players
Houston Dynamo FC draft picks
New Mexico United players
Rio Grande Valley FC Toros players
San Francisco Dons men's soccer players
San Francisco City FC players
Soccer players from California
Sportspeople from Compton, California
USL Championship players
USL League Two players